The Airplay 100 was the national music chart of Romania until its cancellation upon its 28 November 2021 issue. It was compiled weekly by broadcast monitoring service Media Forest, and measured the airplay of songs on radio stations and television channels throughout the country. Since its launch on 26 February 2012, the Airplay 100 had been broadcast on-air each Sunday as a radio show on Kiss FM hosted by Cristi Nitzu. The chart replaced the Romanian Top 100, which was also based on airplay data and had a similar compilation, in 2012.

During the 2010s and early 2020s, 118 singles have reached the number-one position, the first being "Ai Se Eu Te Pego" in 2012 by Brazilian singer Michel Teló. "Astronaut in the Ocean" (2019) by Australian rapper Masked Wolf has spent 13 weeks at the summit, longer than any other song. Multiple artists reached number one with several singles in a calendar year, most notably Moldovan musical project Carla's Dreams with four in 2016—"Te rog", "Sub pielea mea", "Acele" and "Imperfect". The most successful act was Carla's Dreams with nine number ones, followed by Romanian recording artist Smiley with four.

Cat Music have had a large impact on Romanian broadcasting starting with the chart's establishment year, having signed artists such as Smiley, 3 Sud Est, Elena Gheorghe and Voltaj. Every year, the label has released songs that have gone on to be featured on the list of the most broadcast ones in Romania. Global Records are also notable, having signed Inna, Delia and Carla's Dreams. The chart's last number one was "Rita" by Romanian singers Connect-R and Smiley.

Number ones

2010s

2020s

By artist

By song

Notes

References

Romanian record charts
Number-one singles
Romania Singles
2010s (decade)